Arya Babu, also known by the stage name Arya  Badai  is an Indian actress, comedian, model, and television presenter, who appears in Malayalam films and television. She started her career in television and modelling industry. She is best known as a regular comedian in the television comedy Badai Bungalow on Asianet. She has acted on several television series and later turned a television host and also forayed into films. She participated in second season of the Malayalam reality TV series Bigg Boss.

Early life and background
Arya hails from Trivandrum, Kerala, India. She did her schooling at the Holy Angel's Convent Trivandrum. She is a dancer trained in western, cinematic, and semi-classical styles.

Career
Arya made her acting debut while she was studying in plus two (higher secondary) when she got the offer to appear in the television series Officer on Amrita TV. She appeared in two stories and after that she got married. Her sister-in-law Kalpana Susheelan was a model, it persuaded her to search for a career in modelling and began working in commercials for leading clients in the industry, including Chennai Silks and Chemmanur Jewellers. It was followed by her first major role in television, the Tamil soap opera Maharani (2009 – 2011) which was a remake of the Malayalam serial Ente Manasaputhri starring her sister-in-law Archana Suseelan. After that she took a maternity leave for around two years; on return, she acted in serials such as Mohakkadal, Achante Makkal, and Ardram.

The turning point in her career came after contesting in the reality television series Stars on Asianet, which was for serial artists. In one of the episodes she acted on a spoof of the film Njan Gandharvan. Her performance was appreciated by the channel and recommended her name to Diana Sylvester, producer of newly launching comedy show Badai Bungalow (2013 – 2018) who was looking for an actress for Ramesh Pisharody's wife. It was her foray as a comedian and a break in her career. She was a regular in the cast and portrayed a loggerhead named Arya. While doing Badai Bungalow she also did stage show and most notably, the serial Sthreedhanam on Asianet, in which she played Pooja, a bold and outspoken daughter-in-law with a black belt in Karate. The role gave her appreciation.

Later, she began hosting cookery show on television, and also acted in a number of Malayalam films. In 2020, she  contested in the second season of the Malayalam reality TV series Bigg Boss (Malayalam season 2), hosted by actor Mohanlal on Asianet.

Personal life
She married IT engineer Rohit Susheelan and they have a daughter named Roya. Rohit is the brother of television actress Archana Suseelan. In 2018, she opened a boutique named Aroya in Vazhuthacaud. In January 2019, Arya revealed that she is living with her daughter separately from her husband.

Filmography

Film

Television

References

External links

Indian film actresses
Actresses from Thiruvananthapuram
Living people
Actresses in Malayalam cinema
Year of birth missing (living people)
21st-century Indian actresses
Indian television actresses
Actresses in Malayalam television
Female models from Thiruvananthapuram
Actresses in Tamil television
Bigg Boss Malayalam contestants